Bim or Bimin is one of the Ok languages of New Guinea. It is spoken in Sandaun and Western Provinces in the region between the Murray and Strickland Rivers. The language is related to Faiwol but there is also "much intermarriage and cultural exchange with Oksapmin".

References

Languages of Sandaun Province
Languages of Southern Highlands Province
Languages of Western Province (Papua New Guinea)
Ok languages